The 1965 La Flèche Wallonne was the 29th edition of La Flèche Wallonne cycle race and was held on 29 April 1965. The race started in Liège and finished in Marcinelle. The race was won by Roberto Poggiali of the Ignis team.

General classification

References

1965 in road cycling
1965
1965 in Belgian sport
1965 Super Prestige Pernod